Dahlgren is an unincorporated community in Dahlgren Township, Carver County, Minnesota, United States.  The community is located along Highway 212 at Carver County Road 43 near Chaska and Cologne.

References

Unincorporated communities in Carver County, Minnesota
Unincorporated communities in Minnesota